The Arthur Monroe Free House in San Jose, California is a Craftsman-style how which was listed on the National Register of Historic Places in 2002.  It is located at 66 South 14th Street, which previously was 66 South Priest Street.

The house was listed on the National Register for its association with Arthur Monroe Free, a United States Congressman.  Free lived at the house from 1919 until his death in 1953.

However, Donald and Annie Palmer had commissioned the house in 1905 from  residential designer, Emily Williams, their "adopted" daughter and partner of their daughter, Lillian McNeill Palmer. The Palmers lived there until they moved to San Francisco around 1909. Lillian Palmer had a workshop in the basement where she practiced her metal art. Emily and Lillian lived in this house on and off.

References

National Register of Historic Places in Santa Clara County, California
Houses on the National Register of Historic Places in California